Baidu Baike (also known as Baidu Wiki) is a semi-regulated Chinese-language collaborative online encyclopedia owned by the Chinese technology company Baidu. The beta version was launched on April 20, 2006, and the official version was launched on April 21, 2008, edited by registered users.  it has 25.54 million entries and more than 7.5 million editors. It has the largest number of entries in the world of any Chinese-language online encyclopedia.

Baidu officially stated that the Baidu Encyclopedia, while establishing an online encyclopedia, also serves as the information storage space provided by Baidu for netizens. Baidu Baike advocates "equality, collaboration, sharing, and freedom" in spirit, and technically combines this network platform with search engines to meet users' information needs at different levels. When searching using Baidu search engine, if Baidu Baike has included the entry corresponding to the search term, its link will usually be ranked at the top of the search page.

Baidu Baike has been criticised for its censorship, copyright violations, commercialist practices and abundance of unsourced information.

In March 2021, Baidu Baike only allows users whose "wiki level" is greater than 4, have over 85% on editing pass rate and who are in the "wiki master group", or users whose "wiki level" is greater than 6 and have over 85% on editing pass rate, to view article history. Baidu Baike stated that this limit is to "protect the accuracy of articles, and avoid distraction on the false information on past versions."

History
Baidu Baike was founded by Robin Li in April 2006, following the Chinese government's decision to censor Wikipedia in 2005.

The beta version of Baidu Baike was launched on April 20, 2006. From April 5 to 20 for a period of internal testing. According to the serial number in the entry address bar, the first 10 entries were Baidu Baike, "Entries", an edit experiment (sand table page, has been deleted), Mántou (steamed buns), orchid cultivation (deleted due to typos), Yandang Mountain, Lingfeng, Dalongqiu, Wudafusong and Red Food. After 20 days, it had more than 300,000 registered users and more than 100,000 articles, surpassing the number in Chinese Wikipedia.  it had 16 million articles and more than 6.9 million editors.

Baidu's William Chang said at WWW2008, the conference of the World Wide Web Consortium, "There is, in fact, no reason for China to use Wikipedia ... It's very natural for China to make its own products." When searching with the search engine Baidu, the link of the corresponding entry in Baidu Baike, if it exists, will be put as the first result or one of the first results.

In March 2021, Chinese netizens claimed that South Korean netizens changed their entries related to Chinese history on a large scale through the historical version comparison function of Baidu Baike. The exposure of this incident had a negative impact on Baidu Baike. In order to prevent such incidents from recurring, Baidu Baike stipulates that the historical version function is only available to users of the "Baike Expert Group" with a level 4 encyclopedia and a pass rate of over 85% and professional users with a level 6 encyclopedia and a pass rate of over 85%. Open, ordinary users no longer have the right to view historical versions of entries and use the historical version comparison function. Baidu Encyclopedia officially claims that this is to "ensure that the majority of netizens obtain the accuracy of entry information and avoid interference from outdated information in various historical versions".

Features
In addition to the search engine, Baidu Baike also has an information tool that is divided into twelve areas: nature, culture, geography, history, life, society, art, personalities, economy, science, sport and current events. 

Apart from encyclopedias, there are also two other services provided by Baidu, namely Zhidao, a question-and-answer website and Post.

Articles are written and edited by registered users and reviewed by administrators prior to publication. There is no formal way to contact administrators. Contributions from registered users are evaluated under a scoring system. Although the test version was called the Baidu Wiki, official press releases and pages from Baidu Baike itself stated that the system for this was not a Wiki. Baidu Baike does not use MediaWiki. 

Baidu Baike's visual style is simple. In articles, only bolding and hyperlinks are supported. Comments are listed at the bottom of each page. In addition to its Wiki-like functions, the site supports editing, commenting, printing articles and viewing an article's history. 

Users can access multiple editing functions including:
 an image upload system where files weighing less than 2 MB can be added to Encyclopedia articles;
 a categorization system called open category (similar to Folksonomy used in Wikipedia), where an article can be categorized with up to 5 categories;
 a separate edit box for notes and references and external links.

Principles
In this encyclopedia, any comments or articles that contain the following will be removed:
 Pornographic or violent images or texts;
 Adverts;
 Reactionary/anti-CCP content;
 Personal attacks;
 Content that goes against ethics and morals;
 Trivial, malicious or spam content.

Copyright
The copyright policy is outlined on the help page in the terms of use section. In it, Baidu states that by adding content to the site, users agree to waive the copyright of their contributions to Baidu. It also states that the content must not violate intellectual property law and that content using the Creative Commons and/or GNU Free Documentation License (GFDL) must respect the limitations of such licenses. Despite this, Baidu has received criticism for violating the GFDL license when using content directly from Wikipedia, infringing copyright on Hudong.com and tending to plagiarize other sites.

Community
There are three organized groups within the Baidu Baike community. The Baike Elite Team consists of about 340 core contributors that are directed by Baidu and serve as community liaisons. There is also a group of campus ambassadors made of students and an expert team with over 2,500 members, including university professors.

Partnerships
Baidu Baike engages in partnerships with cultural institutions in China and abroad to digitize cultural heritage. In late 2017, Baidu signed an agreement in China to create "2,000 online digital museums" in the next three years. In early 2018, partnerships were expanded to cover 1,000 Spanish cities and tourist sites, including the Camino de Santiago, the Sagrada Família and the Prado Museum.

Controversies and criticism
Baidu Baike has been accused by some critics of censorship and by the former chair of the Wikimedia Foundation of copyright violation. Additionally, Baidu Baike has also been accused of proliferation of commercialization. Due to unsourced information presented in Baidu Baike, there is also concerns over lack of authority and legitimacy over content.

"Open encyclopedia" controversy 
Baidu Baike claims to be an online encyclopedia with open content and editable by everyone, and advocates the spirit of equality and collaboration among users. Generally, when comparing Baidu Baike and Wikipedia, websites in mainland China also emphasize "Baidu Baike" and "Wikipedia". "Encyclopedia" is also an "Internet encyclopedia for all netizens to participate in the compilation".

Baidu Baike imposes partial restrictions on users' editing permissions. Some permissions require users to apply separately after reaching a certain amount of contribution and activity. A small number of entries that are protected by long-term and whose content is locked for a long time cannot be created or edited by users other than the Baidu officials.

The management personnel of Baidu Baike are hired and appointed by Baidu. Compared with the management rights that ordinary users can obtain, they are still in an auxiliary position. Policy decisions related to the development of Baidu Baike are not made through public discussion, review, and voting, and ordinary users lack influence, voice, and editing power. In addition, Baidu Baike launched its own editing service, which is essentially a "brand promotion encyclopedia for businesses", and its neutrality has been questioned.

Censorship

Critics of the encyclopedia note that it censors its content in accordance with the requirements of the Chinese government. Being in the jurisdiction of the Chinese government, Baidu is required to censor content on their encyclopedia in accordance to relevant laws and regulations such as the Cybersecurity Law of the People's Republic of China and the National Intelligence Law. All editors need to register accounts using their real names before editing, and administrators review all edits before they become available to the public. This censorship has attracted criticism.

In 2013 Citizen Lab released a report saying that censorship is known to take place on Baidu Baike but "identifying outright instances or patterns in censorship can be difficult due to the (mostly) user-generated nature and oversight of the content."

Copyright infringement allegations

In 2007, Florence Devouard, then Chair of the Board of Trustees of the Wikimedia Foundation, said that "They [Baidu Baike] do not respect the license at all, [...] That might be the biggest copyright violation we have. We have others." Users of the Chinese Wikipedia created a list of entries allegedly infringing Wikipedia's copyright. The Wikimedia Foundation decided not to pursue any legal action. In response to criticism, Baidu stressed that Baike is a platform for user-generated content.

In the "Encyclopedia Agreement and Baidu Encyclopedia's Rights Description", "Baidu Encyclopedia stipulates that the copyright of the content published by users belongs to the original author. If the copyright is reproduced, the original author or the original website copyright statement shall prevail. Once published, the user agrees to Baidu Baike to enjoy free, permanent, irrevocable, non-exclusive and full sublicense rights and licenses, and then mark the copyright at the bottom of the entry with "©[present year] Baidu".

Baidu Baike users often fail to list the source and mark the original author or the copyright statement of the original website when reprinting content from copyrighted websites or official publications, or completely ignore its license terms, causing infringement of the copyright of others. For example, Wikipedia entries use Copyleft's free content licensing terms, while Baidu Baike’s copyright license is not free. Baidu Baike’s use of Wikipedia’s entry content is copyright infringement. Some even copy all Wikipedia entries, which violates the copyright law of mainland China.

Due to copyright issues, the content of Baidu Baike does not meet various accepted definitions of openness or freedom.

Unsourced and inaccurate information

In addition to copyright disputes, the criticism of Baidu Baike mainly focuses on its academic merits and lack of neutrality. The former is manifested in the lack of detailed and clear source references for the entries it contains, which is contrary to the academic criterion of listing sources, and also makes the accuracy and credibility of the entry to be questioned. Baidu Baike does not limit entries based on notability.

In 2011, an online poll involving 561 Baidu Baike users showed that the main criticisms of users on Baidu Baike included "insufficient review and proliferation of wrong content", "too much plagiarism and copy-pasting and too little original work", "information contained on the entries" and "lack of authority and credibility".

A 2022 study compared articles about liver diseases in English Wikipedia and Baidu Baike. According to the authors, both encyclopedias lack quality and are not satisfactory. But Wikipedia is updated more often than Baidu.

Vandalism and spoof entries

See also

 Chinese encyclopedias
 List of online encyclopedias

References

External links
 
  

2006 establishments in China
Baike
Chinese online encyclopedias
Internet properties established in 2006
Wiki communities
21st-century encyclopedias
Chinese-language websites